Dingele Airport  is an airport serving Dingele, Democratic Republic of the Congo.

See also

Transport in the Democratic Republic of the Congo
 List of airports in the Democratic Republic of the Congo

References

Airports in Sankuru